The Sgt. York Trophy is a trophy which goes to the winner of the triangular season football series between the three Ohio Valley Conference football-playing schools located in the state of Tennessee – Tennessee State University, Tennessee Technological University and the University of Tennessee at Martin. The trophy is named for Alvin York, a leading American war hero of World War I and a native of Tennessee.

History
The Nashville Sports Council and the Ohio Valley Conference announced the creation of the trophy in July 2007. In 2014, Delta Dental of Tennessee became the presenting sponsor of the Trophy. In 2022, Austin Peay left the Ohio Valley Conference and moved to the ASUN Conference, with this move and no future matchups scheduled, Austin Peay is currently no longer competing for the Sgt. York Trophy.

Results

†Won trophy on tiebreaker (In the trophy's first year, 2007, the tiebreaker was head-to-head play. In subsequent years, the previous winner will retain the trophy if they are part of the tie. If the tie is between two other institutions, the trophy will go to the institution that has gone the most seasons without winning the trophy.)

See also
Beehive Boot
Commander-in-Chief's Trophy
Florida Cup
Michigan MAC Trophy

References

College football rivalry trophies in the United States
Tennessee State Tigers football
Tennessee Tech Golden Eagles football
UT Martin Skyhawks football
Awards established in 2007
2007 establishments in Tennessee